Dinner Creek is a stream in Koochiching County, in the U.S. state of Minnesota.

Dinner Creek was named from the fact lumbermen often gathered there for dinner.

See also
List of rivers of Minnesota

References

Rivers of Koochiching County, Minnesota
Rivers of Minnesota